The 2002 Tour de la Région Wallonne was the 29th edition of the Tour de Wallonie cycle race and was held from 29 July to 2 August 2002. The race started in Chaudfontaine and finished in Flobecq. The race was won by Paolo Bettini.

General classification

References

Tour de Wallonie
Tour de la Région Wallonne